The Hysteron Proteron Club, sometimes spelt "Husteron Proteron", was a dining club at Balliol College, Oxford, in the 1920s.

Name
The name refers to a hysteron proteron, a rhetorical device and figure of speech in which a natural or rational order is reversed, as in phrase "then came the thunder and the lightning".

History

The main purpose of the Hysteron Proteron Club was to eat meals backwards, and there was at least one dinner per term, which began with coffee and liqueurs and ended with the soup course. However, the Club's activities went beyond this. Neville Shute later remembered a meal which lasted for twelve hours, beginning at 9 am and going on until 9 pm, starting with coffee and followed by a naked swim at Parsons' Pleasure, usually a pre-breakfast activity. Another dinner was a so-called “circular feast”, at which the courses were, as usual, eaten backwards and each was eaten at a different place around Oxford, beginning and ending at rooms in St Michael's Street.

Graham Greene was a member and told his mother that once a term the club had a "backwards day". He reported that after finishing with porridge "we then returned backwards to Balliol... This morning started with bridge in dinner jackets". Evelyn Waugh, who had been at another college from 1922 to 1924, similarly recalled in A Little Learning that members "put themselves to great discomfort by living a day in reverse". In 1954, Keith Hancock (1898–1988), a distinguished Australian historian, who was at Balliol in the 1920s, revealed that he had "hankered secretly for an invitation to join the Husteron Proteron Club".

The club was revived in 1980 at Trinity, Oxford by a classicist  and the full day backwards was properly done, beginning the day with cigars, brandy and port in black tie.

Allusions
In 1999, Peter Brooke, the son of a Club member, referred to the Club during a debate in the House of Commons on the Greater London Authority Bill:

He mentioned the Club again in a debate on the Learning and Skills Bill in 2000, and again in the House of Lords in July 2002.

Notable members
Nevil Shute (1899–1960)
Victor Hely-Hutchinson (1901–1947)
Henry Brooke (1903–1984)
Graham Greene (1904–1991)

See also
George Hysteron-Proteron

Notes

Balliol College, Oxford
Clubs and societies of the University of Oxford